McMonagle is a surname. Notable people with the surname include:

Donald R. McMonagle (born 1952), manager, Launch Integration, at the Kennedy Space Center, Florida
Gerald McMonagle, former Democratic member of the Pennsylvania House of Representatives
Gerry McMonagle, political figure in Ireland
Hugh McMonagle (1817–1889), inn-keeper and political figure in New Brunswick
John I. McMonagle (1913–1992), former Democratic member of the Pennsylvania House of Representatives
John McMonagle, judge and political figure in Nova Scotia

See also
McGonagle